Henry Farrington (by 1471 – 1549/51), of Farington, Leyland and Worden, Lancashire, was an English politician.

He was a Member (MP) of the Parliament of England for Lancashire in 1529.

References

15th-century births
1551 deaths
Members of the Parliament of England (pre-1707) for Lancashire
English MPs 1529–1536